Newtown High School may refer to:

 Newtown High School (Connecticut)
 Newtown High School (Queens), New York City
 Newtown High School of the Performing Arts, New South Wales
 Newtown High School, Powys
 Newtown High, a fictional TV show on the TV series Big Time Rush

See also
Newton High School (disambiguation)